R2d2 is a mouse gene that is sometimes a selfish gene. 

R2d2 is short for "Responder to meiotic drive 2", It was discovered by UNC School of Medicine researchers to display transmission bias.

R2d2 is a stretch of DNA on mouse chromosome 2 that contains multiple copies of the Cwc22 gene. When seven or more copies of that latter gene are present, R2d2 becomes selfish.

In one lab breeding population, in a selective sweep, R2d2 increased from being in 50 percent of the lab mice's chromosomes to 85 percent in 10 generations. By 15 generations, it reached fixation.

In female mice, R2d2 somehow displaces the chromosome that doesn’t contain it and it is preferentially incorporated into eggs. It has spread in the wild to several parts of the world.

See also
gene drive
Homing endonuclease gene

References

Genes
Mice